In algebraic geometry and commutative algebra, a ring homomorphism  is called formally smooth (from French: Formellement lisse) if it satisfies the following infinitesimal lifting property: 

Suppose B is given the structure of an A-algebra via the map f. Given a commutative A-algebra, C, and a nilpotent ideal , any A-algebra homomorphism  may be lifted to an A-algebra map . If moreover any such lifting is unique, then f is said to be formally étale.

Formally smooth maps were defined by Alexander Grothendieck in Éléments de géométrie algébrique IV.

For finitely presented morphisms, formal smoothness is equivalent to usual notion of smoothness.

Examples

Smooth morphisms 
All smooth morphisms  are equivalent to morphisms locally of finite presentation which are formally smooth. Hence formal smoothness is a slight generalization of smooth morphisms.

Non-example 
One method for detecting formal smoothness of a scheme is using infinitesimal lifting criterion. For example, using the truncation morphism  the infinitesimal lifting criterion can be described using the commutative squarewhere . For example, if and then consider the tangent vector at the origin  given by the ring morphismsendingNote because , this is a valid morphism of commutative rings. Then, since a lifting of this morphism tois of the formand , there cannot be an infinitesimal lift since this is non-zero, hence  is not formally smooth. This also proves this morphism is not smooth from the equivalence between formally smooth morphisms locally of finite presentation and smooth morphisms.

See also 

Dual number
 Smooth morphism
 Deformation theory

References

External links 

 Formally smooth with smooth fibers, but not smooth https://mathoverflow.net/q/333596
 Formally smooth but not smooth https://mathoverflow.net/q/195

Commutative algebra
Algebraic geometry